Norland Place School is a co-educational independent preparatory school for boys and girls 4–11 in Holland Park, London. The school was founded in 1876 by Emily Lord.

History 
Founded in 1876 by Emily Lord, Norland Place School originally housed at 9 Norland Place, now known as No.166 Holland Park Avenue. In the late nineteenth century, the school moved into Nos.164, 166 and 168 Holland Park Avenue. In 1915, Elizabeth MacClymont became headmistress, a position she held for thirty-four years. In the 1920s, Swedish carpentry (slöjd) was amongst the subjects taught to some 332 pupils at the school and Norland obtained its own sports ground in Ealing, where hockey, cricket and tennis were taught. Upon MacClymont's retirement in 1949, the school's wrought iron gates were put up.

The present school 
From September 2020, the school will embark on a three-year plan to accommodate boys in Years 4 to 6. Most boys progress to schools such as Sussex House, Colet Court, Westminster Under and Wetherby. Most girls progress to schools such as Francis Holland, Downe House and St Paul's Girls' School.

Norland has been described by The Good Schools Guide as a "very traditional school (from the berets and boaters to the emphasis on good manners and fair play) but combined with a forward-looking approach." According to Tatler, Norland is one of London's top prep schools.

Famous pupils
Notable former pupils include:

 Katrina Allen, tennis player
 Hilary Benn, politician 
 Rosalind Franklin, chemist
 Finola Hughes, actress
 Scott Keyser, writer
 Sylvestra Le Touzel, actress
 George Osborne, former Chancellor of the Exchequer 
 Joan Beauchamp Procter, zoologist 
 Prunella Stack, woman's rights advocate 
 Veronica Wedgwood, historian

Notes

References

External links
Official Website
Profile at the Independent Schools Council website

1876 establishments in England
Educational institutions established in 1876
Private co-educational schools in London
Private girls' schools in London
Private schools in the Royal Borough of Kensington and Chelsea
Preparatory schools in London
Private boys' schools in London